Star Ball, Starball, star ball  or starball may refer to:
 Starball, UEFA Champions League logo of a football formed from twelve five-pointed stars
 starball, nickname or brand name for various sphere-shaped planetarium projectors
 Starball, Rainbow Arts computed game
 star ball, novelty billiard ball with a star logo
 Star Ball, Roger von Oech creative toy
 Star Ball, racehorse that won the Yerba Buena Stakes in 1977 and 1978
 Star Ball, name of various competitive ballroom dancing events including
 Ohio Star Ball, United States
 Ballroom Dancers' Federation championships' dinner dance
 The Star Ball 1991 book by Dénis Lindbohm